The 31st People's Choice Awards, honoring the best in popular culture for 2004, were held on January 9, 2005, at the Pasadena Civic Auditorium in Pasadena, California. They were hosted by Jason Alexander and Malcolm-Jamal Warner, and broadcast on CBS.

For the first time in the awards history, the winners were decided on by online voting rather than Gallup polls.

Awards
Winners are listed first, in bold. Other nominees are in alphabetical order.

References

External links
2005 People's Choice.com

People's Choice Awards
2004 awards in the United States
2005 in California
January 2005 events in the United States